Tağılar or Tagilar Taghilar or Taghylar or Taglar may refer to:

Tağılar, Barda, a village in the Barda District of Azerbaijan
Tağılar, Kalbajar, a village in the Kalbajar District of Azerbaijan